The King of Na gold seal is a solid gold seal discovered in the year 1784 on Shikanoshima Island in Fukuoka Prefecture, Japan. The seal is designated as a National Treasure of Japan. The seal is believed to have been cast in China and bestowed by Emperor Guangwu of Han upon a diplomatic official (envoy) visiting from Japan in the year 57 AD. The five Chinese characters appearing on the seal identify it as the seal of the King of Na state of Wa (Japan), vassal state of the Han Dynasty. The seal is currently in the collection of the Fukuoka City Museum in Fukuoka, Japan.

Appearance 
The seal is composed of gold of 95% purity. It is made up of a square base, with the seal itself on the bottom face, and a handle on top of the base in the shape of a coiled serpent. It has a mass of 108.729 grams. The total height from base to handle is 2.236 cm. The base of the seal averages 2.347 cm on a side. This dimension roughly corresponds to the traditional Chinese standard unit of length of one cun, as used in the Later Han Dynasty (about 2.304 cm).

Characters engraved on the seal 

The five characters engraved on the seal are (in the order in which they are to be read):  
 漢倭奴國王

The meanings of these characters (in the context of this seal) are: "Han" (referring to the Han Dynasty of China), "Wa" (an ancient name for Japan), "Na" (an ancient kingdom / state within Japan), "state / country", and "ruler". The last two characters, when combined, mean "king / sovereign". Altogether, the meaning of the seal inscription is: "(seal of) the King of the Na state of the Wa [vassal?] of the Han Dynasty".

The characters are engraved in the seal script style.

History 
The seal has been judged to be the one described in the Book of the Later Han, a Chinese chronicle of the history of the Eastern Han Dynasty. According to the chronicle, the Chinese Emperor Guangwu conferred the seal on a diplomatic official visiting from Japan.

Contemporary description of conferral 
The following is the original Chinese text from the chronicle:
建武中元二年，倭奴國奉貢朝賀，使人自稱大夫，倭國之極南界也。光武賜以印綬。

This passage can be translated into English as:
"In the 2nd year of the jianwu zhongyuan reign period [AD 57], the Na state of Wa sent an envoy with tribute. The envoy introduced himself as a high official. The state lies in the far south of Wa. [Emperor] Guangwu bestowed on him a seal with a tassel."

During the Han Dynasty, similar seals were bestowed on other regional sovereigns, in an attempt by the dynasty to bring these sovereigns into the Han ruling order.

Rediscovery 

After being lost for an undetermined period of time, the seal was reportedly rediscovered on April 12, 1784, on Shika Island in Fukuoka Prefecture, Japan. According to contemporary reports, the seal was discovered by a farmer named Jinbei while repairing an irrigation ditch. It was found surrounded by stones forming a box-like structure around it. The stone above the seal required two adults to lift. After rediscovery, the seal was kept by the Kuroda clan, rulers of the Fukuoka Domain, and eventually donated by the Kuroda family to the city of Fukuoka in 1978.

See also 
 King of Dian gold seal
 King of Nanyue gold seal
 List of National Treasures of Japan (archaeological materials)

References 

 

Chinese seal art
Chinese inscriptions
National Treasures of Japan
Gold objects
1st-century artifacts
1784 in Japan
Archaeological discoveries in Asia
History of Fukuoka Prefecture
1784 archaeological discoveries
1st century in Japan
57